Giuseppe Rosati (Foggia, 21 September 1752; Foggia, 1 September 1814) was an Italian physician, agronomist, philosopher and mathematician.

He was born in Foggia from Raffaele Rosati and Marianna Giannone. He attended the University of Medicine in Naples and, at the same time, he studied in philosophy, agronomy and mathematics. In Naples he started to write many works about agronomy, medicine, geography and mathematics. Upon returning to Foggia, he devoted himself to teaching the young and became the "doctor of the poor".

Main works
 La geografia moderna, teoretica, istorica e pratica, Napoli, Raimondi, 1785
 Gli elementi dell’agrimensura teoretica e pratica, Napoli, Raimondi, 1787
 Discorso sull’agricoltura di Puglia 1792
 Elementi dell’aritmetica, Napoli, 1796
 Il metodo millenario, Foggia, 1803
 Elementi per l’edificazione, con 11 tavole, Napoli, Coda, 1805
 Le industrie di Puglia, con una carta geografica incisa dall’autore, Foggia, Variento, 1808
 Breviario dell’Historia sacra, Foggia, Russo, 1815
 Saggio storico sulla medicina, Foggia, Russo, 1826
 Geometria pratica. La piana, Napoli, Caggiano & C., 1832–33

18th-century Italian physicians
Enlightenment scientists
People from Foggia
1752 births
1814 deaths